Anne-Lisa Amadou (4 March 1930 – 19 March 2002) was a Norwegian literary researcher.

She was born in Oslo. In 1966 she took her Doctor of Philosophy (PhD) degree with a thesis on Marcel Proust.

She was a Professor of French literature at the University of Oslo from 1970 to 1982. In 1981 she was awarded the Bastian Prize for her translation of In Search of Lost Time. and, in 1984, the Fritt Ord Honorary Award.

References

1930 births
2002 deaths
Writers from Oslo
Norwegian literary historians
Academic staff of the University of Oslo
Norwegian women academics
20th-century Norwegian translators
20th-century Norwegian women writers
20th-century Norwegian writers
Women literary historians
Norwegian women historians